Acarospora americana is a dark brown to black verruculose to areolate or squamulose crustose lichen with deeply immersed reddish to blackish-brown apothecia found in the Sierra Nevada and other southern California mountain ranges. Lichen spot tests are all negative.

References

americana
Lichen species
Lichens described in 1929
Taxa named by Adolf Hugo Magnusson